Indupalle is a village in Amalapuram Mandal, Dr. B.R. Ambedkar Konaseema district in the state of Andhra Pradesh in India.

Geography 

Demographics 
 India census, Indupalle had a population of 5744, out of which 2902 were male and 2842 were female. The population of children below 6 years of age was 10%. The literacy rate of the village was 78%.

References 

Villages in Amalapuram Mandal